Frank Kreeger  was at the 19th-century professional baseball player. He played for the Kansas City Cowboys of the Union Association in 1884.

External links

1899 deaths
Major League Baseball outfielders
Kansas City Cowboys (UA) players
19th-century baseball players
Year of birth missing